Ion "Jean" Vlădoiu (born 5 November 1968) is a Romanian former professional footballer who played as a striker. He is one of the few who played for the biggest teams of Romania – Steaua București, Rapid București, Dinamo București, Universitatea Craiova, Argeș Pitești and UTA Arad. He was also a manager.

Biography
Vlădoiu played a total of 324 games in Divizia A, scoring 130 goals, being the league topscorer in 1996. He also played 51 games in the Bundesliga, scoring 10 goals.

International career
He won 28 caps for Romania, most of them as a substitute, scoring twice. He played briefly in 1994 FIFA World Cup, coming on as a sub against Switzerland, but then being sent off three minutes later for a bad foul on Switzerland's Christophe Ohrel.

International stats

International goals

Honours
Argeș Pitești
Balkans Cup runner-up: 1987–88

Steaua București
Divizia A: 1992–93, 1995–96, 2000–01
Cupa României: 1991–92, 1995–96
Supercupa României: 1995

Individual
Divizia A top scorer: 1995–96 (25 goals)

References

External links
 
 Labtof profile

1968 births
Living people
People from Argeș County
Sportspeople from Pitești
Romanian footballers
Association football forwards
Romania international footballers
1994 FIFA World Cup players
UEFA Euro 1996 players
FC Rapid București players
FC Dinamo București players
FC Steaua București players
FC Argeș Pitești players
FC UTA Arad players
FC U Craiova 1948 players
1. FC Köln players
Kickers Offenbach players
Liga I players
Liga II players
Bundesliga players
2. Bundesliga players
Romanian football managers
FC Argeș Pitești managers
FC Progresul București managers
Romanian expatriate footballers
Expatriate footballers in Germany
Romanian expatriate sportspeople in Germany